Douglas Sarine is most famous as the ninja in Ask a Ninja.

He graduated from Appalachian State University with a Bachelor of Arts in Communication in 1995.

He is also the villain Galen in The Escapist's weekly series A Good Knight's Quest. He has been a commentator on VH1's Best Week Ever.  He was cowriting an adaptation of Attack of the Killer Tomatoes, but is no longer involved with the project.

He is represented by UTA and John Elliot of Mosaic Media Group.

References

External links
Personal website

American male actors
Living people
Ninja parody
Year of birth missing (living people)
Place of birth missing (living people)
Appalachian State University alumni